In algebra, specifically in the theory of commutative rings, a quasi-unmixed ring (also called a formally equidimensional ring in EGA) is a Noetherian ring  such that for each prime ideal p, the completion of the localization Ap is equidimensional, i.e. for each minimal prime ideal q in the completion ,  = the Krull dimension of Ap.

Equivalent conditions
A Noetherian integral domain is quasi-unmixed if and only if it satisfies Nagata's altitude formula. (See also: #formally catenary ring below.)

Precisely, a quasi-unmixed ring is a ring in which the unmixed theorem, which characterizes a Cohen–Macaulay ring, holds for integral closure of an ideal; specifically, for a Noetherian ring , the following are equivalent:
 is quasi-unmixed.
For each ideal I generated by a number of elements equal to its height, the integral closure  is unmixed in height (each prime divisor has the same height as the others).
For each ideal I generated by a number of elements equal to its height and for each integer n > 0,  is unmixed.

Formally catenary ring 
A Noetherian local ring  is said to be formally catenary if for every prime ideal ,  is quasi-unmixed. As it turns out, this notion is redundant: Ratliff has shown that a Noetherian local ring is formally catenary if and only if it is universally catenary.

References

Appendix of Stephen McAdam, Asymptotic Prime Divisors. Lecture notes in Mathematics.

Further reading
Herrmann, M., S. Ikeda, and U. Orbanz: Equimultiplicity and Blowing Up. An Algebraic Study with an Appendix by B. Moonen. Springer Verlag, Berlin Heidelberg New-York, 1988.

Algebra
Commutative algebra